Roger I (died 1012) was the count of Carcassonne from  and, as Roger II, count of Comminges (from 957) and Couserans (from 983).

Life
Roger was the son of Arnaud I of Comminges and Arsinde of Carcassonne. Associated with the government of Comminges in 957, he inherited the county of Couserans in 983 at the death of his father, Count Arnaud I. At around 1000 he inherited the county of Carcassonne from his mother.

After sharing the government with his son Ramon Roger in Carcassonne, part of the county of Couserans and of the county of Razès and Bernard I Roger in Couserans, he was succeeded by his nephew William I of Carcassonne.

Marriage and issue
In 969 Roger married Adelaide of Rouergue. They had:
Ramon Roger
Bernard-Roger, Count of Bigorre
Peter Roger, Bishop of Girona from 1010-1050
Ermesinde married Ramon Borrell, count of Barcelona.

References

Sources

11th-century births
1012 deaths
Roger 1
Year of birth unknown